Vladimir Nikolayevich Yevsyukov (born 30 November 1953) is a Russian professional football coach and a former player.

External links
 

1953 births
People from Orsk
Living people
Soviet footballers
FC Orenburg players
FC Lada-Tolyatti players
PFC Krylia Sovetov Samara players
Russian football managers
FC Lada-Tolyatti managers
FC Metallurg Lipetsk managers
FC Gornyak Uchaly managers
Association football midfielders
Association football forwards
Sportspeople from Orenburg Oblast